A leadership election for ANO 2011 was held on 28 February 2017. Incumbent Andrej Babiš was re-elected with 195 of the 206 votes. He was the only candidate. Babiš appreciated that he didn't receive 100% of votes.

Results

References

ANO 2011 leadership elections
2017 elections in the Czech Republic
Single-candidate elections
Indirect elections
Elections in Prague
ANO 2011 leadership election